Natalie Jane Imbruglia (born 4 February 1975) is an Australian singer and actress. In the early 1990s, she played Beth Brennan in the Australian soap opera Neighbours. Three years after leaving the programme, she began a singing career with her chart-topping cover of Ednaswap's song  "Torn". Her debut album, Left of the Middle (1997), sold seven million copies worldwide. Imbruglia's five subsequent albums have combined sales of three million copies worldwide, and her accolades include eight ARIA Awards, two Brit Awards, one Billboard Music Award, and three Grammy nominations.

Imbruglia has appeared in several films, including the 2003 release Johnny English and the 2009 Australian indie film Closed for Winter. She has modelled for several brands, such as L'Oreal, Gap, and Kailis.

Amongst other philanthropic work, Imbruglia served as a longtime spokesperson for Virgin Unite and campaigns to raise awareness of obstetric fistula.

On 16 June 2021, Imbruglia announced on her official Twitter page that her single "Build It Better" would be released on 18 June 2021. It serves as the first single from her sixth studio album Firebird, which was released on 24 September 2021. This album represents a return to music after a six-year hiatus during which she says she experienced "writer's block." She also won the third series of The Masked Singer UK as  "Panda."

Life and career

1975–1994: Early life and career beginnings 
Imbruglia was born on 4 February 1975, in Sydney, Australia, second of four daughters of Maxene (née Anderson) and Elliot Imbruglia. Her father is of Italian descent, a Sicilian from Lipari who immigrated to Australia with his family aged five, and her mother is of Irish, Scottish and English descent, with an ancestor who arrived in Australia as a convict in the First Fleet. Imbruglia grew up in Berkeley Vale, New South Wales and attended Mater Dei College. At fifteen, she moved to Sydney with her family and studied ballet, tap and Highland dancing.

Imbruglia appeared in Australian television commercials for Coca-Cola and the Australian snack Twisties. She left school at the age of sixteen, to pursue acting. She secured a role as Beth Brennan on the Australian soap opera Neighbours where she shared a house with Ben Mitchell who played the part of Cameron Hudson. By the end of her second year, she left the show to move to London in 1994. She met Anne Barret, who became her manager and convinced her to record a demo of four songs. She signed a record deal with BMG, after a demo of "Torn" impressed RCA Records.

1997–2000: Left of the Middle and international breakthrough 
Imbruglia's first international single, "Torn", was a cover of an Ednaswap song. It reached #2 on the UK Singles Chart in November 1997, number one on airplay around the world and number one on the Billboard Airplay chart for 14 weeks. It sold more than one million copies in the United Kingdom alone. As of 2011, "Torn" was the most played song on Australian radio since 1990, played 300,500 times since 1997, an average of 75 a day, based on data compiled by the Australian Performing Rights Association (APRA).

It was released as a radio single in the US, but not on CD. The single was on Billboards Hot 100 Airplay chart for 14 weeks. At the time, singles not released commercially could not be on the overall Hot 100 chart (combined sales and airplay). By the time the policy changed, "Torn" was heading down the charts, so its peak on the Hot 100 ended at 42. The single also topped the Top 40 Mainstream/CHR Pop and Adult Top 40 charts.

In October 1997, it broke the airplay record in the UK (more than 2000 plays) for six weeks. It was No. 1 for 14 weeks in the UK radio chart, equalled only by Simply Red's "Fairground". Rick Dees, in his Top 40 Chart show, named "Torn" as the 'number one radio single of 1990s' in the 2000 Millennium Countdown show broadcast from KIIS-FM on New Year's Eve.

Imbruglia appeared with David Armand midway through his 'interpretative dance' to sing Torn at Amnesty International's The Secret Policeman's Ball (2006).

Imbruglia's debut album Left of the Middle was released on 24 November 1997. It sold 350,000 in the UK three weeks after release and was certified platinum. It has sold 7 million copies. The second single in the UK after "Torn" was "Big Mistake", which debuted at #2. "Wishing I Was There" was less successful, peaking at #19. "Wishing I Was There" only peaked at #2 on UK radio in summer 1998, and in the US peaked at #14 on the Top 40 Show. The final single from Left of the Middle was "Smoke", the reception was more divided than previously. It was a hit in the UK and made the top 5, while in Australia it missed the top 40. Eventually, the album became a million-seller after charting well in many countries and entering the Top 10 in the US and UK. In 1999, she recorded a cover of "Never Tear Us Apart" by INXS with Tom Jones, which appeared on his album Reload.

The "Torn" single and the Left of the Middle album earned Imbruglia six ARIA Awards in 1998, while the "Wishing I Was There" single and her overall worldwide achievements earned her two more ARIA awards in 1999, an MTV Award for Best New Artist in 1998, and three constitutive Grammy nominations in 1999. That year, she won two Brit Awards for Best International Newcomer and Best International Female. She was ranked No. 11 on Rock of the Net's single artists of the year in 1998, and No. 76 in 2001. Imbruglia tied up her four-album deal with BMG after her compilation album, Glorious: The Singles 97–07.

 2001–2004: White Lilies Island 
Imbruglia's next album, White Lilies Island, in 2001, was named after where she lived beside the River Thames at Windsor. Imbruglia co-wrote every track over three years. The album's first single, "That Day", was stylistically different from her singles but did not reach the UK Top 10. In the US, "Wrong Impression" was the first single and charted in the Hot 100 Singles and adult contemporary charts. In the UK it did slightly better than That Day. "Beauty on the Fire", the final single, barely entered charts worldwide, and did not make the top 50 in Australia. The album, briefly notorious in the Sony BMG copy protection rootkit scandal, sold 1 million but did not repeat the success of Left of the Middle.

Imbruglia's third album was ready by November 2003; however her record label refused to release it. She was given songs to record with Swedish pop producers, Bloodshy & Avant. She and the record label separated at the beginning of 2004. Four months later she signed with Brightside Recordings, formed by a former Innocent Records executive, Hugh Goldsmith.
In 2003, she appeared in the spy parody film Johnny English, playing Rowan Atkinson's love interest, Lorna Campbell, in a Bond girl–style role.

 2005–2008: Counting Down the Days 
In April 2005, Imbruglia's third album Counting Down the Days had "Shiver" as its first single. "Shiver" became her longest-charting single in the UK since "Torn." It topped UK airplay charts for several weeks, reaching eighth in the UK. It became the most-played song of 2005. Counting Down The Days became her first album to reach the top spot on the album charts.

"Sanctuary" was the second single from the album and singles sent to radio stations. The decision was later changed to the title track "Counting Down the Days", with stations asked to play the album version, because the radio mix was not finished. The single on 25 July did not have as much success in the singles chart as "Shiver," although it reignited interest in its album and received airplay in the UK. Due to the single, the album re-entered the top 40 in the UK charts.

Imbruglia made a small European tour (her first since Left of the Middle) in late October and November. Though the album never entered UK Top 40 again, several concerts sold out; notably London.

The album was the 100th-best-selling album in 2005, selling 204,877 copies in the UK alone.

Imbruglia started on her fourth album in late 2005. In mid-2007, plans changed and her record company released a compilation of Imbruglia's 10 years in music. The only single from the album—"Glorious"—premiered in BBC Radio 1 on The Chris Moyles Show. The Singles Collection debuted at #5 in the UK, including the single "Glorious" as well as a DVD of Imbruglia's videos. The album sold 600,000 copies.

 2009–2014: Come to Life, musical hiatus and stage debut 

In late-2008, in the second year of work on her eventual 2009 album Come to Life, Imbruglia parted with her label, Brightside/Sony BMG. She obtained the rights to songs recorded for the album and planned to record on her own label, Malabar Records. Songs were co-written with Ben Hillier, Dave McCracken, her then-husband Daniel Johns, Gary Clark, Jamie Hartman, Paul Harris, Shep Solomon and Chris Martin of Coldplay. Some tracks were produced by Hillier and mixed by Danton Supple.

Accompanied by an extensive television advertising campaign and press campaign, Come to Life was released, through Island Records, on 2 October 2009 in Australia. It entered the Australian albums chart at #67 on 19 October 2009, making it Imbruglia's worst performing album to date, selling just 750 copies in its first week of release and spending only two weeks in the Top 100. It had been announced that the album would be released in the United Kingdom (UK) on 3 May 2010, preceded by the track "Scars" to be released as a single on 22 March 2010. Following the disappointing reaction on the Australian charts, the official UK launch of the album, and the single, was delayed, then cancelled. All plans to launch the album in the United States were also cancelled, with the album eventually made available online through Amazon Music.

After the failure of Come to Life, Imbruglia took a six-year hiatus from music, shifting her focus back to acting. Imbruglia moved to Los Angeles and hired acting coach Ivana Chubbuck. She appeared in three movies over the next five years, Closed for Winter (2009), Underdogs (2013) and Among Ravens (2014).

In April 2014, Imbruglia made her stage debut in a UK production of Things We Do For Love, at the Theatre Royal, Bath.

 2014–2018: Male 

On 3 December 2014, Imbruglia signed with Sony Masterworks and planned to make her first album in five years, covering famous songs by a range of male artists. The first single is a cover of "Instant Crush", originally by Daft Punk featuring Julian Casablancas. Male was released on 31 July 2015, her fifth studio album. During the spring of 2017, Imbruglia took her Acoustic Tour to Europe in support of the album. In 2018 she continued with a tour around the UK.

 2018–present: Firebird and Neighbours finale
In an Instagram post in November 2018, Imbruglia stated that new music was due in 2019. In February 2019 it was announced that Albert Hammond Jr. of The Strokes was in the studio with Imbruglia working on new music, along with Strokes producer Gus Oberg.

Imbruglia signed to BMG in July 2019, her original record label from 1997 to 2007, with plans to release an album of new material sometime in 2020. This was subsequently pushed back to 2021.

On 18 June 2021, Imbruglia released "Build It Better", the first single from her sixth studio album Firebird, which was released on 24 September 2021. The official video for "Build It Better" was directed by Amy Becker-Burnett, with choreography by Gregory Haney and Alex Sarmiento. "Build It Better" did not enter the Official UK Top 100 Chart, but peaked at #67 on the Official Singles Sales Chart Top 100 and at number 66 on the Official Singles Download Chart Top 100.

In 2022, Imbruglia won the third series of the British version of The Masked Singer as  "Panda". Imbruglia released her version of "Story of My Life" (a song she performed on the show) on 12 February 2022. It debuted on the UK Official Singles Sales Chart Top 100 at number 49. The Firebird album re-entered the UK Official Album Downloads chart at number 32.

On 28 July 2022, Imbruglia made a cameo appearance as Beth in the final-ever Neighbours episode. Her appearance was filmed alongside Holly Valance's character, Felicity Scully.

In October 2022, she appeared as a guest interviewee on Fran Kelly's TV show Frankly.

 Other ventures 
In May 2010, Imbruglia became a judge on the second season of the Australian version of The X Factor. She mentored the Girls category, in which her final act Sally Chatfield was the runner up of the series. In 2011, she did not return for the third season and was replaced by Natalie Bassingthwaighte.

In June that year, Imbruglia appeared on the original British version of the show, where she was a guest judge for the Birmingham auditions on its seventh series.

In 2016 Imbruglia was cast in the second season of SBS TV series First Contact.

 Personal life 

 Relationships and citizenship 
Natalie Imbruglia is the elder sister of singer-songwriter Laura Imbruglia.

During her time on Neighbours she briefly dated her co-star Stefan Dennis. 

Imbruglia dated American actor David Schwimmer in the late 1990s.

In 1999, Imbruglia met Silverchair frontman Daniel Johns backstage at his band's concert in London. They started dating after meeting again at the ARIA awards after-party at the Gazebo Hotel in Sydney in October of the same year. After years of an on-and-off relationship, they announced their engagement shortly before Christmas 2002, and they married on New Year's Eve 2003 in a beach ceremony in Port Douglas, Queensland, Australia. Imbruglia stated in a 2002 interview that meeting Johns saved her from depression. Johns wrote the song "Satisfied" for Imbruglia's 2005 album Counting Down the Days, which he also produced, and co-wrote the song "Want" from Imbruglia's 2009 album Come to Life. Imbruglia wrote her 2005 single "Counting Down the Days" about their long-distance relationship, as Imbruglia was based in London and Johns lived in Newcastle, Australia. They announced their divorce on 4 January 2008, stating, "We have simply grown apart through not being able to spend enough time together."

Imbruglia became a naturalised British citizen in 2013.

Imbruglia has tattoos of Sanskrit/Hindi inscription "Shreya" on her neck which is a Sanskrit word for "auspicious" or "beautiful", a Chinese tattoo on her left foot which means "courage" and Sanskrit Aum on her lower back.

On 9 October 2019, Imbruglia announced on Instagram that she had given birth to a baby boy and named him Max Valentine Imbruglia. The child was conceived using IVF and sperm from an unnamed donor.

 Philanthropy 
 Imbruglia is an ambassador for Virgin Unite and supports campaigns to end poverty and to bring attention to obstetric fistula.
 She appeared in a sketch at the Secret Policeman's Ball for Amnesty International on 31 October 2006.
 She has spoken of clinical depression to raise awareness about the disorder.
 2008 saw her support the Fashion Targets Breast Cancer campaign in support of Breakthrough Breast Cancer, alongside comedian Alan Carr, DJ & presenter Edith Bowman, actress Anna Friel and model Twiggy.

 Awards and nominations 
{| class="wikitable sortable plainrowheaders" 
|-
! scope="col"| Award
! scope="col"| Year
! scope="col"| Nominee(s)
! scope="col"| Category
! scope="col"| Result
! scope="col" class="unsortable"| 
|-
! scope="row" rowspan="2"| APRA Music Awards
| 1999
| "Big Mistake"
| rowspan="2"| Most Performed Foreign Work
| 
| 
|-
| 2006
| "Shiver"
| 
| 
|-
!scope="row" rowspan="14"| ARIA Music Awards
| rowspan="9"| 1998
| rowspan="5"| Left of the Middle
| Album of the Year
| 
| rowspan="9"| 
|-
| Best Female Artist
| 
|-
| Best New Talent
| 
|-
| Breakthrough Artist – Album
| 
|-
| Best Pop Release
| 
|-
| rowspan="3"| "Torn"
| Single of the Year
| 
|-
| Breakthrough Artist – Single
| 
|-
| rowspan="2"| Highest Selling Single
| 
|-
| "Big Mistake"
| 
|-
| rowspan="3"| 1999
| Left of the Middle
| Highest Selling Album
| 
| rowspan="3"| 
|-
| Herself
| Outstanding Achievement
| 
|-
| "Wishing I Was There"
| rowspan="3"| Best Female Artist
| 
|-
| 2002
| White Lilies Island
| 
| 
|-
| 2005
| Counting Down the Days
| 
| 
|-
! scope="row" rowspan="3"| Billboard Music Awards
| rowspan="3"| 1998
| rowspan="2"| "Torn"
| Top Hot 100 Airplay Track
| 
| rowspan="3"| 
|-
| Top Adult Top 40 Track
| 
|-
| Herself
| Top Adult Top 40 Artist
| 
|-
! scope="row" rowspan="3"| Grammy Awards
| rowspan="3"| 1999
| Herself
| Best New Artist
| 
| rowspan="3"| 
|-
| Left of the Middle
| Best Pop Vocal Album
| 
|-
| "Torn"
| Best Female Pop Vocal Performance
| 
|-
! scope="row" rowspan="3"| MTV Europe Music Awards
| rowspan="3"| 1998
| rowspan="2"| Herself
| Best New Act
| 
| rowspan="3"| 
|-
| Best Female
| 
|-
| "Torn"
| Best Song
| 
|-
! scope="row" rowspan="2"| Mo Awards
| rowspan="2"| 1998
| rowspan="2"| Natalie Imbruglia
| Rock Performer of the Year 
| 
| rowspan="2"| 
|-
| Australian Showbusiness Ambassador
| 
|-
! scope="row" rowspan="3"| MTV Video Music Award
| rowspan="3"| 1998
| rowspan="3"| "Torn"
| Best New Artist 
| 
| rowspan="3"| 
|-
| Best Female Video
| 
|-
| Viewer's Choice
| 
|-
! scope="row" rowspan="4"| NME Awards
| rowspan="2"| 1998
| rowspan="4"| Herself
| Best New Band
| 
| rowspan="2"| 
|-
| Best Solo Artist
| 
|-
| rowspan="2"| 1999
| Most Desirable Person
| 
| rowspan="2"| 
|-
| Top Pop Personality You'd Most Like as Your Doctor
| 
|-
! scope="row" rowspan="3"| Žebřík Music Awards
| 1997
| rowspan="3"| Herself
| rowspan="3"| Best International Female
| 
| rowspan="2"| 
|-
| 1998
| 
|-
| 2005
| 
| 

 Tours HeadliningSupporting'''

Take That – TTX tour (2024)

Discography

 Left of the Middle (1997)
 White Lilies Island (2001)
 Counting Down the Days (2005)
 Come to Life (2009)
 Male (2015)
 Firebird'' (2021)

Filmography

Film

Television

Theatre

Endorsements

References

External links 

 
 

1975 births
Actresses from Sydney
ARIA Award winners
Australian expatriates in England
Australian emigrants to England
Australian film actresses
Australian people of Sicilian descent
Australian people of Irish descent
Australian people of Italian descent
Australian singer-songwriters
Australian soap opera actresses
Australian women pop singers
Australian women singer-songwriters
Brit Award winners
Island Records artists
Living people
Masked Singer winners
MTV Europe Music Award winners
Naturalised citizens of the United Kingdom
People educated at St Peter's Catholic College, Tuggerah
RCA Records artists
Singers from Sydney
20th-century Australian women singers
21st-century English women singers
21st-century Australian women singers